The 1987 Delaware Fightin' Blue Hens football team represented the University of Delaware as a member of the Yankee Conference during the 1987 NCAA Division I-AA football season. Led by 22nd-year head coach Tubby Raymond, the Fightin' Blue Hens compiled an overall record of 5–6 with a mark of 2–5 in conference play, placing in a three-way tie for fifth in the Yankee Conference. The team played home games at Delaware Stadium in Newark, Delaware.

Schedule

References

Delaware
Delaware Fightin' Blue Hens football seasons
Delaware Fightin' Blue Hens football